Walking on a Dream is the debut studio album by Australian electronic music duo Empire of the Sun, released on 3 October 2008 by Capitol Records. The album was produced by band members Luke Steele and Nick Littlemore, along with Peter Mayes and Donnie Sloan. It was recorded and mixed by Peter Mayes at Soundworks Music Studio in Sydney at various times throughout 2007, with additional recording by Chris Vallejo at Linear Recording, also in Sydney. In 2010, the song “Half Mast” was sampled on rapper Mac Miller’s song “The Spins”, which was featured on his breakout mixtape K.I.D.S.. 

"Walking on a Dream" was released on 30 August 2008 as the album's lead single, going on to the be the Empire of the Sun's biggest hit worldwide. The second single, "We Are the People", was released on 20 September 2008. The album reached number six on the Australian Albums Chart and number 19 on the UK Albums Chart, whilst hitting number one on the UK Dance Albums Chart. The album has been certified double platinum in Australia and gold in both the United Kingdom and the United States.  

Walking on a Dream received generally favourable reviews. It received 11 nominations at the ARIA Music Awards of 2009, winning seven, including Album of the Year. It was also nominated for Best International Album at the 2010 BRIT Awards. In 2010, the album was ranked at number 29 in the book 100 Best Australian Albums. A special edition of the album, containing a bonus disc of remixes, B-sides, and unreleased tracks, was released on 20 November 2009.

Background and release
The album was recorded and mixed by Peter Mayes at Soundworks Music Studio in Sydney at various times throughout 2007, with additional recording by Chris Vallejo at Linear Recording, also in Sydney. According to EMI Music Australia's website, the painting of Steele and Littlemore that comprises the album artwork was based on the iconic film posters for Indiana Jones and Star Wars.

Walking on a Dream reached number six on the Australian Albums Chart and number 19 on the UK Albums Chart. The album has been certified double platinum in Australia and gold in the United Kingdom.

"Walking on a Dream" was released on 30 August 2008 as the album's lead single. The video features Steele and Littlemore, wearing faux-oriental costumes and makeup inspired by Peking Opera, on location along the Bund in Shanghai, China between 21 and 27 July 2008.

The second single, "We Are the People", was released on 20 September 2008. The video for the song was shot in Mexico, and used the ancient Mexican festival Day of the Dead (Día de Muertos) as its inspiration. Locations included the gardens of Sir Edward James at Las Pozas, Monterrey and García.

Critical reception

Walking on a Dream received generally positive reviews from music critics. At Metacritic, which assigns a normalised rating out of 100 to reviews from mainstream publications, the album received an average score of 61, based on 19 reviews. 

Andrew Leahey of AllMusic wrote that Empire of the Sun "[festoon] their music with oddball flourishes, androgynous lyrics, and a general sense of theatricality that borders on schizophrenia", concluding, "Like the music it promotes, the cover art is purposely ludicrous, but listeners who have a palette for such whimsy should walk away happy." Martin Robinson of the NME described the duo as "silly but their songs demand to be taken seriously, just like Prince, Ultravox and Bowie." Blenders Tyler Gray stated, "Acoustic guitar strummed in time with dance beats, tinny vocals and tons of slap-back reverb—it's like some magical pop formula concocted long ago by aboriginal Australian  and parceled out ever since to INXS, Midnight Oil, Outback Steakhouse jingle makers and now this turquoise-loving duo." Andy Gill of The Independent opined that the songs "Walking on a Dream" and "We Are the People" "rather resemble The Beloved or Air, sharing with those duos the impression that the music just seems to have settled, like snow, around the melody."

Mike Orme of Pitchfork wrote that "at their indulgent best [the duo] strike a trenchant middle ground between fantasy and historical revisionism", but expressed that "although Empire tries mightily, they collapse underneath too many ideas before the record is even half over." Michael Cragg of musicOMH felt that the album "offers little in the way of musical experimentation" and that "[m]ost of it sounds like a strange amalgam of Fleetwood Mac and MGMT, as if the latter had been transposed from the slightly grubby streets of Brooklyn to the beaches of Australia." Christian Hoard of Rolling Stone noted that the duo "have lots of straightforward pop chops, but they prefer to get wonky with cheesetastic, Eighties-flavored keyboards and nonsense rhymes like 'Hotdog belt donut melt/Magpie knelt by itself'", adding that the album "sounds like Europop on Special K". At The Guardian, Dorian Lynskey commented that "the slick, pastel-wardrobed MOR of the title track and 'We Are the People' demonstrate melodic agility and sun-dazzled charm", but viewed the album as "a ripe cheese, best not consumed whole." Alex Denney of The Observer remarked that "the record settles upon a cooler hue, favouring minor-key shuffles that, at their best, sound like prime Bangles cuts, but tend towards pedestrian 1980s pop hackery at their worst." Tyler Fisher of PopMatters concluded that, "despite the well-developed '80s image, the music emulated is not anything worth reviving."

Accolades
The album was listed at number 29 in the book 100 Best Australian Albums, published in October 2010.

Awards

ARIA Awards
The ARIA Music Awards of 2009 nominations were announced on 8 October 2009. Empire of the Sun received more nominations than any other artist, with a total of 11. The winners were announced on 26 November 2009.

|-
| rowspan="11"| 2009
| rowspan="3"| Walking on a Dream
| Album of the Year
| 
|-
| Highest Selling Album
| 
|-
| Best Pop Release
| 
|-
| rowspan="3"| "Walking on a Dream"
| Single of the Year
| 
|-
| Highest Selling Single
| 
|-
| rowspan="2"| Best Video (directed by Josh Logue)
| 
|-
| "We Are the People"
| 
|-
| Empire of the Sun
| Best Group
| 
|-
| Empire of the Sun and Donnie Sloan with Peter Mayes
| Producer of the Year
| 
|-
| Aaron Hayward and David Homer from Debaser
| Best Cover Art
| 
|-
| Peter Mayes
| Engineer of the Year
|

Brit Awards

|-
| rowspan="2"| 2010
| Empire of the Sun
| International Breakthrough Act
| 
|-
| Walking on a Dream
| International Album
|

Track listing

Personnel
Credits adapted from the liner notes of Walking on a Dream.

 Empire of the Sun – production
 Debaser – artwork, illustrations
 Mike Marsh – mastering
 Peter Mayes – mixing, production, recording
 Donnie Sloan – production 
 Chris Vallejo – additional recording

Charts

Weekly charts

Year-end charts

Certifications

Release history

References

2008 debut albums
ARIA Award-winning albums
Capitol Records albums
Empire of the Sun (band) albums
Virgin Records albums